Mexico at the Pan American Games.

Medal count

Medals by summer sport
As of the conclusion of the 2019 Pan American Games

References

External links
COM - Comité Olímpico Mexicano Official site.